Amanoeae is a tribe of the family Phyllanthaceae. It comprises 2 genera.

See also 
 Taxonomy of the Phyllanthaceae

References 

Phyllanthaceae
Malpighiales tribes
Historically recognized angiosperm taxa